Joly may refer to:

People
Alexandre Joly (born 1948), French pyrotechnic entrepreneur and politician
Charles Jasper Joly (1864–1906), Irish mathematician and astronomer 
Cyril Bencraft Joly, soldier and writer
Dom Joly (born 1967), British television comedian
Édouard Joly (1898–1982), French aeroplane designer
Eva Joly (born 1943), Norwegian-born French magistrate and politician
Greg Joly (born 1954), Canadian ice hockey player
John Joly (1857–1933), Irish scientist
Maurice Joly (1829–1878), French satirist and lawyer
Mélanie Joly (born 1979), Canadian lawyer and politician
Rene Joly (born 1965), Canadian-Martian
Sébastien Joly (born 1979), French road-racing cyclist
Joly Braga Santos (1924–1988), Portuguese composer and conductor

Other uses
 Joly, Ontario, a township in the Almaguin Highlands region 
 Joly (crater), impact crater on Mars
 Grupo Joly, Spanish publishing company

See also
 Jolly (disambiguation)
 Jollie, a surname
 Jollie River, New Zealand